Megalopyge crispata, the black-waved flannel moth, crinkled flannel moth or white flannel moth, is a moth of the Megalopygidae family. It is found along the east coast of the United States, and as far inland as Oklahoma.

This wingspan is 25–40 mm. Adults are on wing from May to October. There is one generation per year in the north, two or more in the south.

The stinging larvae feed on various trees and shrubs.

External links
Bug Guide
Images
Caterpillars of Eastern Forests

Megalopygidae